Shivin Narang (born 7 August) is an Indian actor who works in Hindi television. He made his acting debut with Suvreen Guggal – Topper of The Year playing Yuvraj Singh in 2012. Narang is best known for his portrayal of Rudra Roy in Sony TV's romantic-thriller Beyhadh 2 (2019–2020). In 2020, he participated in Fear Factor: Khatron Ke Khiladi 10 where he finished in fifth place.

Narang has also featured in several music videos. He made his Bollywood film debut with a supporting role in the Amitabh Bachchan starrer slice-of-life comedy-drama Goodbye in 2022.

Career

Debut and breakthrough (2012–2018)

Narang made his television debut with Channel V India's Suvreen Guggal – Topper of The Year (2012–13), backed by 4 Lions Films, where he was cast as Yuvraj Singh, a youngster studying in college and the boyfriend of the titular lead.

He achieved desirable prominence when he got the main role of the titular lead's elder step brother Ranvijay Singh in Star Plus's multi starrer Ek Veer Ki Ardaas...Veera, created by Beyond Dreams Production, alongside Farnaz Shetty and Digangana Suryavanshi, wherein he was present from 2013–2015 until its end.

After two years, Narang was seen in 2017 as Reyhan in the second season of the international TV series Cahaya Cinha. His first music video Dil Zaffran, sung by Rahat Fateh Ali Khan was released in 2018. In August 2018, he joined the lead cast of Colors TV's romantic drama Internet Wala Love opposite Tunisha Sharma as radio jockey Jai Mittal but the show went off air in March 2019.

Further success, music videos and film debut (2018–present)

In 2019, Narang agreed to participate in and shot as a contestant for Colors TV's stunt based reality show Fear Factor: Khatron Ke Khiladi 10 that was broadcast in 2020. His second music video, Yaad Piya Ki Aane Lagi co-starring Divya Khosla Kumar, was launched in November 2019 and became a chartbuster hit.

In December 2019, he started gaining praise for his work as Rudra Roy opposite Jennifer Winget in Sony TV's thriller Beyhadh 2, produced by Prateek Sharma. The show was abruptly cancelled without a proper ending in March 2020 due to COVID-19 pandemic.

In 2022, he was seen as Mudassar Singh in Goodbye opposite Rashmika Mandanna.

Filmography

Films

Television

Music videos

See also
List of Indian television actors

References

External links

 
 

Living people
Indian male television actors
Fear Factor: Khatron Ke Khiladi participants
Year of birth missing (living people)